Hirsau (formerly Hirschau) is a district of the town of Calw in the German state of Baden-Württemberg, located in the south-west portion of the country, about two miles north of Calw and about twenty-four miles west of Stuttgart.

Town
Hirsau's economy includes small retail establishments, tourism, and light industry.  There is a saw mill on the Ernstmuhlerweg, the road that runs along the railroad in the post card pasted above.  The saw mill is a long building at the upper edge (in the picture) of town.

The town has been called a "Luftkurort" ("air spa") for the purity of its air.  The town's bridge over the Nagold River dates to the Carolingian period.

Hirsau Abbey

The town grew round the Benedictine monastery that is its main historical significance and was once among the most famous in Europe. It was founded in about 830 by Count Erlafried of Calw and re-founded, after a period of collapse, in 1059. William of Hirsau, abbot from 1069 to 1091, brought it to international prominence as the origin of the Hirsau Reforms. It was secularised in 1558, and the buildings destroyed by the French in 1692.

References
Baer, 1897. Die Hirsauer Bauschule. Freiburg.
Giseke, 1883. Die Hirschauer während des Investiturstreits. Gotha.
Helmsdorfer, 1874. Forschungen zur Geschichte des Abts Wilhelm von Hirschau. Göttingen
Klaiber, C.H., 1886. Das Kloster Hirschau. Tübingen.
Steck, 1844. Das Kloster Hirschau
Süssmann, 1903. Forschungen zur Geschichte des Klosters Hirschau. Halle.
Weizsäcker, 1898. Führer durch die Geschichte des Klosters Hirschau. Stuttgart

External links

 Hirsau im Nagoldtal

Towns in Baden-Württemberg